The 1974–75 season saw Leeds United compete in the Football League First Division. As reigning English champions, they also competed in the European Cup.

Season summary
Manager Don Revie left after many successful years at Leeds to manage the England side. He was replaced by Brighton & Hove Albion's Brian Clough—this appointment raised many eyebrows, as Clough had often made public his disdain for both Revie and the playing style of his Leeds side, even clamouring for the club to be relegated on disciplinary grounds.

As it turned out, Clough only lasted 44 days at Elland Road. He alienated several key players like Johnny Giles, Norman Hunter and Billy Bremner and reportedly, in his first training session, told the players to "throw [their] medals in the bin because they were not won fairly." After a poor start which saw Leeds in 19th place after one win from the opening six games and only 4 points from a possible 12 won, the Leeds directors sacked Clough.

Replacing Clough was Bolton Wanderers' Jimmy Armfield. Armfield, while unable to turn the club's fortunes around to finish higher than ninth, bought the Yorkshire club better success in the European Cup, with the club reaching the final against Bayern Munich in Paris. The German side won 2–0 with two goals in 10 minutes late in the second half, but Leeds could have won the match, having denied two strong penalty appeals for fouls by Bayern's Franz Beckenbauer. Indeed, Leeds did get a goal in the 63rd minute, through Peter Lorimer, but Beckenbauer successfully convinced referee Michel Kitabdjian to consult with the linesman, who had not raised his flag; Kitabdijan subsequently indicated Lorimer was marginally offside. This decision to not allow the goal caused riots to break out amongst the travelling Leeds fans.

The violence during the riots saw Leeds banned from European competition for four years (later reduced to two on appeal); but, as Leeds would not qualify for European competition again until the early 1990s, the ban was never applied.

Nonetheless, bitterness remains amongst the Leeds fans even today, due to their perception of being cheated of victory and the European Cup. Over 40 years on, Leeds fans can still be heard chanting at away matches "We are the champions, champions of Europe".

Squad

Left club during season

Competitions

First Division

Table

Results

Source:

FA Charity Shield

FA Cup

Source:

League Cup

Source:

European Cup

Source:

Final

Awards
At the end of the season, defender Gordon McQueen was named the club's Player of the Year.

Notes

References

Leeds United F.C. seasons
Leeds United
Foot